The Kannaland Local Municipality council consists of seven members elected by mixed-member proportional representation. Four councillors are elected by first-past-the-post voting in four wards, while the remaining three are chosen from party lists so that the total number of party representatives is proportional to the number of votes received.

Results 
The following table shows the composition of the council after past elections.

December 2000 election

The following table shows the results of the 2000 election.

October 2002 floor crossing

In terms of the Eighth Amendment of the Constitution and the judgment of the Constitutional Court in United Democratic Movement v President of the Republic of South Africa and Others, in the period from 8–22 October 2002 councillors had the opportunity to cross the floor to a different political party without losing their seats.

In the Kannaland council, three councillors from the Democratic Alliance (DA) crossed the floor: one to the New National Party (NNP) which had formerly been part of the DA, one to the African National Congress (ANC), and one to sit as an independent. The single councillor from the Pan Africanist Congress also crossed to the ANC.

September 2004 floor crossing
Another floor-crossing period occurred on 1–15 September 2004, in which the single NNP councillor crossed to the ANC.

March 2006 election

The following table shows the results of the 2006 election.

September 2007 floor crossing
The final floor-crossing period occurred on 1–15 September 2007; floor-crossing was subsequently abolished in 2008 by the Fifteenth Amendment of the Constitution. In the Kannaland council, three councillors from the ANC and two from the Independent Civic Organisation crossed to the newly-formed National People's Party.

By-elections from September 2007 to May 2011
The following by-elections were held to fill vacant ward seats in the period between the floor crossing period in September 2007 and the election in May 2011.

May 2011 election

The following table shows the results of the 2011 election.

August 2016 election

The following table shows the results of the 2016 election.

The local council sends one representative to the council of the Garden Route District Municipality.  that councillor is a representative of the DA.

November 2021 election

The following table shows the results of the 2021 election.

Notes

References

Kannaland
Elections in the Western Cape